Crisis was a British comic magazine published from September 1988 to October 1991 as an experiment by Fleetway to see if intelligent, mature, politically and socially-aware comics were saleable in the United Kingdom. The magazine was initially published fortnightly, and was one of the most visible components of the late-1980s British comics boom, along with Deadline, Revolver, and Toxic!.

History
Conceived by editor Steve MacManus, Crisis would offer to make the work creator-owned, which might lead to the chance for royalties and greater copyright control, which was a departure from the way they had done business up until then. They also planned to turn the stories into American comic books which would sell better on the other side of the Atlantic, although ultimately only the first few titles got this treatment and the title moved to shorter stories after issue #14.

As a 2000 AD spin-off, it was initially science fiction based. It began with two stories: "Third World War", by Pat Mills and Carlos Ezquerra, extrapolated some of the effects of global capitalism on the developing world into the near future, as seen through the eyes of a group of young conscript "peace volunteer" soldiers; "New Statesmen" was a "realistic superhero" strip by John Smith and Jim Baikie. "Third World War" later moved on from developing world topics to minority issues within the UK and introduced two new artists, Sean Phillips and Duncan Fegredo, while Mills took on co-writers including Alan Mitchell and Malachy Coney.

When "New Statesmen" finished it was replaced by two contemporary stories: "Troubled Souls" by Garth Ennis and John McCrea, set amid the "troubles" of Northern Ireland, and "Sticky Fingers", a flatshare comedy by Myra Hancock and David Hine. "Troubled Souls" was Ennis's comics debut, and led to a sequel, "For a Few Troubles More", and a religious satire, "True Faith", the latter illustrated by Warren Pleece.

"True Faith" and another proposed strip, "Skin" by Peter Milligan and Brendan McCarthy, about skinheads and thalidomide, ran into problems with censorship. Robert Maxwell, Fleetway's then owner, withdrew the collected edition of True Faith from sale after receiving objections from religious groups; "Skin" was dropped after the printers refused to handle it, citing its harsh language and controversial subject matter. Skin was later published as a graphic novel by Tundra, and failed to generate any noticeable outrage.

Another casualty of censorship was John Smith and Sean Phillips's "Straitgate". Its main character was intended to be a self-obsessed young loner who suffers from delusions and ends up going on a killing spree, but was toned down until he became little more than a self-obsessed young loner.

Grant Morrison and Steve Yeowell contributed "The New Adventures of Hitler" (originally published in Cut, a Scottish arts and culture magazine), a speculative story about how the young Adolf Hitler's stay in England might have affected his later actions. Morrison also wrote "Bible John", illustrated by Daniel Vallely, about a series of murders in Glasgow, and "Dare", his revisionist take on Dan Dare. "Dare" was drawn by Rian Hughes, and had started in Revolver, the sister comic of Crisis. Revolver folded before the last episode of the story, which was therefore concluded in Crisis. Morrison's frequent collaborator Mark Millar contributed a grim prison story, "Insiders", drawn by Paul Grist.

Later issues of Crisis included a number of translated European strips, including Milo Manara and Federico Fellini's "Trip to Tulum" (collected in a trade paperback published by Catalan Communications) and a number of short strips by Miguelanxo Prado. After issue 49 Crisis was published monthly, for 14 further issues, finally ending in October 1991.

Other creators whose work appeared in Crisis include Simon Bisley, Glenn Fabry, John Hicklenton, Philip Bond, Si Spencer, Peter Doherty, Igor Goldkind, James Robinson, Tony Salmons, Oscar Zarate, Paul Neary and Steve Parkhouse.

One of the characters in "Third World War" got his own spin-off series in 2000 AD, "Finn".

Editors
 Steve MacManus #1–49
 Steve MacManus and Michael W. Bennent #50–52
 Michael W. Bennent #53–63

Stories

Third World War
Book I
Issues: 1-14
Episodes: 14
Pages: 196 of strip, plus 14 pages of text
Script: Pat Mills
Art: Carlos Ezquerra episodes 1-6, 9-14; D'Israeli 7; Angie Mills 8
Dated: 17/9/88 to 18/3/89

Book II
Issues: 15-27, 29-38
Episodes: 23
Pages: 322
Script: Pat Mills 1-23; with Alan Mitchell 3-7, 10-23, and Malachy Coney 8-9
Art: Angie Mills 1; John Hicklenton 2, 11, 14, 20; Carlos Ezquerra 3-4, 6-7; Duncan Fegredo 5, 12; Sean Phillips 8-10, 13, 18-19; Sean Phillips & Shaun Hollywood 16; Richard Piers-Rayner 15; Richard Piers-Rayner & Tim Perkins 23; Glyn Dillon 17; Steve Pugh 21; Robert Blackwell 22
Dated: 1/4/89 to 17/2/90
Note: Segments "Ivan's Story" in #36 and "Ryan's Story" in #25, 29 and 35 conclude in Book IV.

Book III: The Big Heat
Issues: 40-41, 43-48
Episodes: 8
Pages: 112
Script: Pat Mills and Alan Mitchell
Art: Glynn Dillon 1-4; Rob Blackwell 5-8
Dated: 17/3/90 to 7/7/90

Book IV: Ivan's Story
Issues: 49-51
Episodes: 3
Pages: 42
Script: Pat Mills and Tony Skinner
Art: Steve Pugh
Dated: 21/7/90 to Oct 90
Note: Episodes 2-4 of story beginning in #36.

Book IV: The Final Problem
Issue: 53
Episodes: 1
Pages: 14
Script: Pat Mills and Alan Mitchell
Art: John Hicklenton
Dated: Dec 90
Note: Fourth episode of "Ryan’s Story," from #25, 29, 35.

New Statesmen
Issues: 1-12
Episodes: 12
Pages: 192 strip, plus 13 text
Script: John Smith
Art: Jim Baikie 1-4, 9-12; Sean Phillips 5-6; Duncan Fegredo 7-8
Dated: 17/9/88 to 18/2/89

Epilogue
Issues: 13-14
Episodes: 2
Pages: 26
Script: John Smith
Art: Sean Phillips
Dated: 4/3/89 to 18/3/89

Prologue
Issue: 28
Episodes: 1
Pages: 14
Script: John Smith
Art: Jim Baikie
Dated: 30/9/89

Sticky Fingers
Issues: 15-21, 23-27
Episodes: 12
Pages: 81
Script: Myra Hancock
Art: David Hine
Dated: 1/4/89 to 16/9/89

Troubled Souls
Issues: 15-20, 22-27
Episodes: 12
Pages: 89
Script: Garth Ennis
Art: John McCrea
Dated: 1/4/89 to 16/9/89

To Serve and Protect
Issue: 21
Episodes: 1
Pages: 6
Script and art: Floyd R. Jones-Hughes
Dated: 24/6/89

The Geek
Issue: 22
Episodes: 1
Pages: 7
Script: Mal Coney
Art: Jim McCarthy
Dated: 8/7/89

The Student Konstabel
Issue: 28
Episodes: 1
Pages: 8
Script and art: Phillip J. Swarbrick
Dated: 30/9/89

Angels Among Us
Issues: 28-38
Episodes: 11
Pages: 15
Script and art: Philip Bond
Dated: 30/9/89 to 17/2/90
Note: a.k.a. "The Crooked Mile".

True Faith
Issues: 29-38
Episodes: 11 (2 episodes in issue 38)
Pages: 91
Script: Garth Ennis
Art: Warren Pleece
Dated: 14/10/89 to 17/2/90

Her Parents
Issue: 31
Episodes: 1
Pages: 5
Script: Mark Millar
Art: John McCrea
Dated: 11/11/89

The Clicking of High Heels
Issue: 32
Episodes: 1
Pages: 7
Script: Sarah Bromley-Anderson
Art: Floyd Hughes
Dated: 25/11/89

Two Pretty Names
Issue: 33
Episodes: 1
Pages: 5
Script: Si Spencer and Sue Swasey
Art: Phil Laskey and Carol Swain
Dated: 9/12/89

Squirrels in Carroll Street
Issue: 34
Episodes: 1
Pages: 5
Script and art: Floyd Hughes
Dated: 23/12/89

Feedback
Issue: 34
Episodes: 1
Pages: 2
Script and art: Al Davidson
Dated: 23/12/89

Didn't You Love My Brother?
Issue: 35
Episodes: 1
Pages: 11
Script: Tony Allen
Art: David Hine
Dated: 6/1/90

Suburban Hell
The Unusual Obsession of Mrs Orton
Issue: 36
Episodes: 1
Pages: 7
Script: Garth Ennis
Art: Phillip J. Swarbrick
Dated: 20/1/90

Banged Up
Issue: 37
Episodes: 1
Pages: 7
Script: Jack Blackburn
Art: David Lloyd
Dated: 3/2/90

The Death Factory
Issue: 39
Episodes: 1
Pages: 21
Script: Pat Mills
Art: Sean Phillips
Dated: 3/3/90
Note: Amnesty International issue.

A Kind of Madness
Issue: 39
Episodes: 1
Pages: 7
Script: Pat Mills
Art: Sean Phillips
Dated: 3/3/90

A Day in the Life
Issue: 39
Episodes: 1
Pages: 4
Script: Igor Goldkind
Art: Glenn Fabry
Dated: 3/3/90

Murky Waters
Issue: 40
Episodes: 1
Pages: 7
Script: James Robinson
Art: Tony Salmons
Dated: 17/3/90

For a Few Troubles More
Issues: 40-43, 45-46
Episodes: 6
Pages: 46
Script: Garth Ennis
Art: John McCrea
Dated: 17/3/90 to 9/6/90
Note: Sequel to "Troubled Souls".

Brighton Gas
Issue: 41
Episodes: 1
Pages: 7
Script: Gary Pleece
Art: Warren Pleece
Dated: 31/3/90

C-RAP
Issue: 41
Episodes: 1
Pages: 1
Script: Peter Hogan
Art: Anoniman
Dated: 31/3/90

China in Crisis 1989
Issues: 42, 45
Episodes: 2
Pages: 20
Script: Tony Allen
Art: Dave Hine
Dated: 14/4/90 and 26/5/90

Passion and Fire
Issue: 42
Episodes: 1
Pages: 8
Script: Carlos Sampayo
Art: Oscar Zarote
Dated: 14/4/90

Faceless
Issue: 42
Episodes: 1
Pages: 7
Script and art: Floyd Hughes
Dated: 14/4/90

The Ballad of Andrew Brown
Issue: 43
Episodes: 1
Pages: 8
Script: Garth Ennis
Art: Phil Winslade
Dated: 28/4/90Try a Little TendernessIssue: 44
Episodes: 1
Pages: 6
Script: Si Spencer
Art: Steve Sampson
Dated: 12/5/90Masters of DisguiseIssue: 44
Episodes: 1
Pages: 1
Script and art: Tomoko Rei Sato
Dated: 12/5/90The Soldier and the FarmerIssue: 44
Episodes: 1
Pages: 10
Script: Igor Goldkind
Art: David Lloyd and Caroline Dellaporta
Dated: 12/5/90The New Adventures of HitlerIssues: 46-49
Episodes: 4
Pages: 48
Script: Grant Morrison
Art: Steve Yeowell
Dated: 9/6/90 to 21/7/90FelicityIssue: 47
Episodes: 1
Pages: 5
Script: Chris Standley
Art: Peter Doherty
Dated: 23/6/90The Soldier and the PainterIssue: 48
Episodes: 1
Pages: 6
Script: Igor Goldkind
Art: Phil Winslade
Dated: 7/7/90Chicken RunIssue: 49
Episodes: 1
Pages: 5
Script: Gary Pleece
Art: Warren Pleece
Dated: 21/7/90StraitgateIssues: 50-53
Episodes: 4
Pages: 46
Script: John Smith
Art: Sean Phillips
Dated: Sept 90 to Dec 90No Messing With RupertIssue: 50
Episodes: 1
Pages: 11
Script: Oscar Zarate
Art: Carlos Sampayo
Dated: Sept 90Your Death, My LifeIssue: 50
Episodes: 1
Pages: 8
Script and art: Milo Manara
Dated: Sept 90
Note: Translated by Frank Wynne.Suddenly, Last Week…Issue: 51
Episodes: 1
Pages: 5
Script: Nicholas Vince
Art: Paul Johnson
Dated: Oct 90The WallIssue: 51
Episodes: 1
Pages: 8
Script: Tony Allen
Art: Enki Bilal
Dated: Oct 90The Power of the PenIssue: 51
Episodes: 1
Pages: 8
Script and art: Alberto Braccia
Dated: Oct 90
Note: Translated by Frank Wynne.Prisoner of JusticeIssue: 52
Episodes: 1
Pages: 14
Script: Alan Mitchell
Art: Glenn Fabry
Dated: Nov 90The Happiest DaysIssue: 52
Episodes: 1
Pages: 8
Script: Martine d’Ellard
Art: Caroline Della Porta
Dated: Nov 90VroomIssues: 52-58
Episodes: 7
Pages: 28
Script: Iz
Art: Dix
Dated: Nov 90 to June 91SinnerViet Blues
Issues: 52-55
Episodes: 4
Pages: 38
Script and art: Carlos Sampayo and Jose Muñoz
Colours: Steve Whitaker
Dated: Nov 90 to Feb 91
Note: Translated by Deborah Bonner and Kim Thompson.The SchoolIssue: 53
Episodes: 1
Pages: 6
Script: Martine d’Ellard
Art: Ed Hillyer
Dated: Dec 90InsidersIssues: 54-59
Episodes: 6
Pages: 60
Script: Mark Millar
Art: Paul Grist
Dated: Jan 91 to June 91The General and the PriestIssues: 54-55
Episodes: 2
Pages: 21
Script: Igor Goldkind
Art: Jim Baikie
Dated: Jan 91 to Feb 91In Cages, There is No EscapeIssue: 54
Episodes: 1
Pages: 4
Script and art: Paul Johnson
Dated: Jan 91Passing ThroughIssue: 55
Episodes: 1
Pages: 4
Script and art: Miguelanxo Prado
Dated: Feb 91
Note: Translated by Frank Wynne.The Real Robin HoodIssues: 56-61
Episodes: 6
Pages: 48
Script: Michael Cook
Art: Gary Erskine and Bernie Jaye
Dated: March 91 to Aug 91Bible JohnIssues: 56-61
Episodes: 6
Pages: 48
Script: Grant Morrison
Art: Daniel Vallely
Dated: March 91 to Aug 91Happenstance and KismetIssues: 56-61
Episodes: 6 (Parts 8-13)
Pages: 34
Script: Paul Neary
Art: Steve Parkhouse and Bernie Jaye
Dated: March 91 to Aug 91
Note: Continued from Revolver.DareIssue: 56
Episodes: 1 (Part 8)
Pages: 10
Script: Grant Morrison
Art: Rian Hughes
Dated: March 91
Note: Final episode of series "Dare" from Revolver.Up on the RoofIssue: 57
Episodes: 1
Pages: 6
Script and art: Dave Hine
Dated: April 91LovebiteIssue: 58
Episodes: 1
Pages: 5
Script: Steve Tanner
Art: Pete Venters
Dated: May 91Rainbow CafeIssue: 58
Episodes: 1
Pages: 3
Script and art: Simon Harrison
Dated: May 91Lord JimIssue: 59
Episodes: 1
Pages: 16
Script: Igor Goldkind
Art: Steve Sampson
Dated: June 91Trip to TulumIssues: 60-63
Episodes: 4
Pages: 69
Script: Federico Fellini
Art: Milo Manara
Dated: July 91 to Oct 91
Note: Translated by Stefano Gaudiano.Unlikely Stories, MostlyEndgame
Issue: 60
Episodes: 1
Pages: 3
Script and art: Miguelanxo Prado
Dated: July 91Light MeIssue: 61
Episodes: 1
Pages: 8
Script: Garth Ennis
Art: Phil Winslade
Dated: Aug 91WormsIssue: 62
Episodes: 1
Pages: 7
Script and art: Dave Hine
Dated: Sept 91Waddle on the Wild SideIssue: 62
Episodes: 1
Pages: 5
Script and art: Al Davison
Dated: Sept 91Charlie Lives With Fang and SnugglesIssue: 62
Episodes: 1
Pages: 8
Script: Garth Ennis
Art: Ian Oldham
Dated: Sept 91Body SnatchersIssue: 62
Episodes: 1
Pages: 7
Script: Ian Abinett & Alan Coweill
Art: Andrew Currie
Dated: Sept 91Strange HotelIssue: 62
Episodes: 1
Pages: 4
Script: Si Spencer
Art: Adrian Dungworthy
Dated: Sept 91The Big VoiceIssue: 63
Episodes: 1
Pages: 8
Script: Nick Abadzis
Art: Edmund Perryman
Dated: Oct 91Operation MassacreIssue: 63
Episodes: 1
Pages: 15
Script and art: Francisco Solano Lopez and Gabriel Solano Lopez
Dated: Oct 91Commuter’s Journey'Issue: 63
Episodes: 1
Pages: 2
Script and art: Nick Abadzis
Dated: Oct 91

Notes

References

 

Further reading
 "Four-Colour Classics" in Judge Dredd Megazine'' #276, 14 October 2008, pp. 16–22

External links
 A Crisis fansite
 A brief guide to the comic
 Crisis at the Barney comics database

Defunct British comics
1988 comics debuts
Comics about politics
Science fiction comics
Comics spin-offs
Comics anthologies
Magazines established in 1988
Magazines disestablished in 1991
Biweekly magazines published in the United Kingdom
Monthly magazines published in the United Kingdom